This article lists feature-length British films and full-length documentaries that have their premiere in 2021 and were at least partly produced by the United Kingdom. It does not feature short films, medium-length films, made-for-TV films, pornographic films, filmed theater, VR films or interactive films, nor does it include films screened in previous years that had official release dates in 2021.

British films box office 
The highest-grossing British films released in 2021, by domestic box office gross revenue, are as follows:

Film premieres

January–March

April–June

July–September

October–December

Other premieres

Culturally British films 
The following list comprises films not produced by Great Britain or the United Kingdom but is strongly associated with British culture. The films in this list should fulfil at least three of the following criteria:
 The film is adapted from a British source material.
 The story is at least partially set in the United Kingdom.
 The film was at least partially shot in the United Kingdom.
 Many of the film's cast and crew members are British.

British winners 

Listed here are the British nominees at the five most prestigious film award ceremonies in the English-speaking world: the Academy Awards, British Academy Film Awards, Critics' Choice Awards, Golden Globe Awards, and Screen Actors Guild Awards, that were held in 2021, celebrating the best films of 2020 and early 2021.

Academy Awards
The 93rd Academy Awards, honouring the best films of 2020 and early 2021, were held on 25 April 2021.

British winners:
 The Father (Best Actor, Best Adapted Screenplay)
 Promising Young Woman (Best Original Screenplay)
 Tenet (Best Visual Effects)
 Andrew Jackson (Best Special Visual Effects – Tenet)
 Andrew Lockley (Best Special Visual Effects – Tenet)
 Anthony Hopkins (Best Actor – The Father)
 Atticus Ross (Best Original Score – Soul)
 Christopher Hampton (Best Adapted Screenplay – The Father)
 Daniel Kaluuya (Best Supporting Actor – Judas and the Black Messiah)
 Martin Desmond Roe (Best Live Action Short Film – Two Distant Strangers)

British nominees:
 Borat Subsequent Moviefilm (Best Supporting Actress, Best Adapted Screenplay)
 Emma (Best Makeup and Hairstyling, Best Costume Design)
 The Father (Best Picture, Best Supporting Actress, Best Production Design, Best Film Editing)
 Promising Young Woman (Best Picture, Best Director, Best Actress, Best Film Editing)
 A Shaun the Sheep Movie: Farmageddon (Best Animated Feature Film)
 Tenet (Best Production Design)
 Wolfwalkers (Best Animated Feature Film)
 Alexandra Byrne (Best Costume Design – Emma)
 Andrew Jackson (Best Special Visual Effects – Tenet)
 Andrew Lockley (Best Special Visual Effects – Tenet)
 Atticus Ross (Best Original Score – Mank)
 Carey Mulligan (Best Actress – Promising Young Woman)
 Celeste (Best Original Song – The Trial of the Chicago 7)
 Dan Mazer (Best Adapted Screenplay – Borat Subsequent Moviefilm)
 Dan Swimer (Best Adapted Screenplay – Borat Subsequent Moviefilm)
 Daniel Pemberton (Best Original Song – The Trial of the Chicago 7)
 Emerald Fennell (Best Picture, Best Director, Best Original Screenplay, Outstanding British Film – Promising Young Woman)
 Gary Oldman (Best Actor – Mank)
 Nathan Crowley (Best Production Design – Tenet)
 Oliver Tarney (Best Sound – News of the World)
 Olivia Colman (Best Supporting Actress – The Father)
 Peter Baynham (Best Adapted Screenplay – Borat Subsequent Moviefilm)
 Riz Ahmed (Best Actor – Sound of Metal)
 Sacha Baron Cohen (Best Supporting Actor – The Trial of the Chicago 7, Best Adapted Screenplay – Borat Subsequent Moviefilm)
 Vanessa Kirby (Best Actress – Pieces of a Woman)

British Academy Film Awards
The 74th British Academy Film Awards were held on 10 and 11 April 2021.

British winners:
 The Father (Best Actor, Best Adapted Screenplay)
 His House (Outstanding Debut by a British Writer, Director or Producer)
 Promising Young Woman (Best Original Screenplay, Outstanding British Film)
 Rocks (Best Casting)
 Tenet (Best Special Visual Effects)
 Andrew Jackson (Best Special Visual Effects – Tenet)
 Andrew Lockley (Best Special Visual Effects – Tenet)
 Anthony Hopkins (Best Actor – The Father)
 Atticus Ross (Best Original Music – Soul)
 Bukky Bakray (Rising New Star)
 Christopher Hampton (Best Adapted Screenplay – The Father)
 Daniel Kaluuya (Best Supporting Actor – Judas and the Black Messiah)
 Emerald Fennell (Best Original Screenplay, Outstanding British Film – Promising Young Woman)
 Farah Nabulsi (Best Short Film – The Present)
 Noel Clarke (Outstanding British Contribution to Cinema)

British nominees:
 Ammonite (Best Costume Design)
 Borat Subsequent Moviefilm (Best Supporting Actress)
 Calm with Horses (Best Supporting Actor, Best Supporting Actress, Best Casting, Outstanding British Film)
 David Attenborough: A Life on Our Planet (Best Documentary)
 The Dig (Best Adapted Screenplay, Best Costume Design, Best Makeup and Hair, Best Production Design, Outstanding British Film)
 Emma (Best Costume Design)
 The Father (Best Picture, Best Editing, Best Production Design, Outstanding British Film)
 His House (Best Actress, Outstanding British Film)
 Limbo (Outstanding British Film, Outstanding Debut by a British Writer, Director or Producer)
 The Mauritanian (Best Picture, Best Actor, Best Adapted Screenplay, Best Cinematography, Outstanding British Film)
 Moffie (Outstanding Debut by a British Writer, Director or Producer)
 Mogul Mowgli (Outstanding British Film)
 Promising Young Woman (Best Film, Best Casting, Best Editing, Best Original Music)
 Rebecca (Best Production Design)
 Rocks (Best Director, Best Actress, Best Supporting Actress, Best Original Screenplay, Outstanding British Film, Outstanding Debut by a British Writer, Director or Producer)
 Saint Maud (Outstanding British Film, Outstanding Debut by a British Writer, Director or Producer)
 Wolfwalkers (Best Animated Film)
 Alexandra Byrne (Best Costume Design – Emma)
 Alice Babidge (Best Costume Design – The Dig)
 Andrew Jackson (Best Special Visual Effects – Tenet)
 Andrew Lockley (Best Special Visual Effects – Tenet)
 Atticus Ross (Best Original Music – Mank)
 Bukky Bakray (Best Actress, Outstanding British Film – Rocks)
 Cathy Featherstone (Best Production Design – The Father)
 Chris Lawrence (Best Special Visual Effects – The Midnight Sky)
 Claire Wilson (Best Original Screenplay, Outstanding Debut by a British Writer, Director or Producer – Rocks)
 Conrad Khan (Rising Star Award)
 Jenny Shircore (Best Makeup and Hair – The Dig)
 Katie Spencer (Best Production Design – Rebecca)
 Kingsley Ben-Adir (Rising Star Award)
 Kosar Ali (Best Supporting Actress – Rocks)
 Lucy Pardee (Best Casting – Rocks)
 Mark Coulier (Best Makeup and Hair – Pinocchio)
 Michael O'Connor (Best Costume Design – Ammonite)
 Moira Buffini (Best Adapted Screenplay – The Dig)
 Morfydd Clark (Rising Star Award)
 Peter Francis (Best Production Design – The Father)
 Riz Ahmed (Best Actor – Sound of Metal)
 Sarah Greenwood (Best Production Design – Rebecca)
 Sarah Gavron (Best Director – Rocks)
 Sean Bobbitt (Best Cinematography – Judas and the Black Messiah)
 Sope Dirisu (Rising Star Award)
 Tatiana Macdonald (Best Production Design – The Dig)
 Theresa Ikoko (Best Original Screenplay, Outstanding Debut by a British Writer, Director or Producer – Rocks)
 Vanessa Kirby (Best Actress – Pieces of a Woman)
 Wunmi Mosaku (Best Actress – His House)
 Eyelash (Best Short Film)
 Lizard (Best Short Film)
 Lucky Break (Best Short Film)
 Miss Curvy (Best Short Film)
 The Present (Best Short Film)

Critics' Choice Awards
The 26th Critics' Choice Awards were held on 7 March 2021.

British winners:
 Borat Subsequent Moviefilm (Best Supporting Actress)
 Promising Young Woman (Best Actress, Best Original Screenplay)
 Tenet (Best Visual Effects)
 Atticus Ross (Best Score – Soul)
 Carey Mulligan (Best Actress – Promising Young Woman)
 Daniel Kaluuya (Best Supporting Actor – Judas and the Black Messiah)
 Emerald Fennell (Best Original Screenplay – Promising Young Woman)

British nominees:
 Borat Subsequent Moviefilm (Best Comedy)
 Emma (Best Costume Design, Best Production Design, Best Hair and Makeup)
 The Father (Best Actor, Best Supporting Actress, Best Adapted Screenplay)
 The Personal History of David Copperfield (Best Costume Design, Best Production Design)
 Promising Young Woman (Best Picture, Best Director, Best Costume Design, Best Hair and Makeup)
 Tenet (Best Production Design, Best Score)
 Alexandra Byrne (Best Costume Design – Emma)
 Anthony Hopkins (Best Actor – The Father)
 Atticus Ross (Best Score – Mank)
 Christopher Hampton (Best Adapted Screenplay – The Father)
 Dev Patel (Best Performance in a Motion Picture – Musical or Comedy – Actor – The Personal History of David Copperfield)
 Emerald Fennell (Best Director – Promising Young Woman)
 Gary Oldman (Best Actor – Mank)
 Kave Quinn (Best Production Design – Emma)
 Nathan Crowley (Best Production Design – Tenet)
 Olivia Colman (Best Supporting Actress – The Father)
 Paul Greengrass – (Best Adapted Screenplay – News of the World)
 Robert Worley (Best Costume Design – The Personal History of David Copperfield)
 Riz Ahmed (Best Actor – Sound of Metal)
 Sacha Baron Cohen (Best Supporting Actor – The Trial of the Chicago 7)
 Vanessa Kirby (Best Actress – Pieces of a Woman)

Golden Globe Awards
The 78th Golden Globe Awards were held on 28 February 2021.

British winners:
 Borat Subsequent Moviefilm (Best Motion Picture – Musical or Comedy, Best Performance in a Motion Picture – Musical or Comedy – Actor)
 Atticus Ross (Best Original Score – Soul)
 Daniel Kaluuya (Best Supporting Performance in a Motion Picture – Actor – Judas and the Black Messiah)
 Rosamund Pike (Best Performance in a Motion Picture – Drama – Actress – I Care a Lot)
 Sacha Baron Cohen (Best Performance in a Motion Picture – Musical or Comedy – Actor – Borat Subsequent Moviefilm)

British nominees:
 Borat Subsequent Moviefilm (Best Performance in a Motion Picture – Musical or Comedy – Actress)
 Emma (Best Performance in a Motion Picture – Musical or Comedy – Actress)
 The Father (Best Motion Picture – Drama, Best Performance in a Motion Picture – Drama – Actor, Best Supporting Performance in a Motion Picture – Actress, Best Screenplay)
 The Mauritanian (Best Supporting Performance in a Motion Picture – Actress)
 The Personal History of David Copperfield (Best Performance in a Motion Picture – Musical or Comedy – Actor)
 Promising Young Woman (Best Motion Picture – Drama, Best Performance in a Motion Picture – Drama – Actress, Best Director, Best Screenplay)
 Tenet (Best Original Score)
 Wolfwalkers (Best Animated Feature Film)
 Anthony Hopkins (Best Performance in a Motion Picture – Drama – Actor – The Father)
 Anya Taylor-Joy (Best Performance in a Motion Picture – Musical or Comedy – Actress – Emma)
 Atticus Ross (Best Original Score – Mank)
 Carey Mulligan (Best Performance in a Motion Picture – Drama – Actress – Promising Young Woman)
 Christopher Hampton (Best Screenplay – The Father)
 Celeste (Best Original Song – The Trial of the Chicago 7)
 Daniel Pemberton (Best Original Song – The Trial of the Chicago 7)
 Dev Patel (Best Performance in a Motion Picture – Musical or Comedy – Actor – The Personal History of David Copperfield)
 Emerald Fennell (Best Director, Best Screenplay – Promising Young Woman)
 Gary Oldman (Best Performance in a Motion Picture – Drama – Actor – Mank)
 James Corden (Best Performance in a Motion Picture – Musical or Comedy – Actor – The Prom)
 Olivia Colman (Best Supporting Performance in a Motion Picture – Actress – The Father)
 Riz Ahmed (Best Performance in a Motion Picture – Drama – Actor – Sound of Metal)
 Sacha Baron Cohen (Best Supporting Performance in a Motion Picture – Actor – The Trial of the Chicago 7)
 Vanessa Kirby (Best Performance in a Motion Picture – Drama – Actress – Pieces of a Woman)

Screen Actors Guild Awards
The 27th Screen Actors Guild Awards were held on 4 April 2021.

British winners:
 Alex Sharp (Outstanding Performance by a Cast in a Motion Picture – The Trial of the Chicago 7)
 Daniel Kaluuya (Outstanding Performance by a Male Actor in a Supporting Role – Judas and the Black Messiah)
 Eddie Redmayne (Outstanding Performance by a Cast in a Motion Picture – The Trial of the Chicago 7)
 Mark Rylance (Outstanding Performance by a Cast in a Motion Picture – The Trial of the Chicago 7)
 Sacha Baron Cohen (Outstanding Performance by a Male Actor in a Supporting Role, Outstanding Performance by a Cast in a Motion Picture – The Trial of the Chicago 7)

British nominees:
 Anthony Hopkins (Outstanding Performance by a Male Actor in a Leading Role – The Father)
 Carey Mulligan (Outstanding Performance by a Female Actor in a Leading Role – Promising Young Woman)
 Delroy Lindo (Outstanding Performance by a Cast in a Motion Picture – Da 5 Bloods)
 Gary Oldman (Outstanding Performance by a Male Actor in a Leading Role – Mank)
 Jonny Coyne (Outstanding Performance by a Cast in a Motion Picture – Ma Rainey's Black Bottom)
 Kingsley Ben-Adir (Outstanding Performance by a Cast in a Motion Picture – One Night in Miami...)
 Olivia Colman (Outstanding Performance by a Female Actor in a Supporting Role – The Father)
 Riz Ahmed (Outstanding Performance by a Male Actor in a Leading Role – Sound of Metal)
 Vanessa Kirby (Outstanding Performance by a Female Actor in a Leading Role – Pieces of a Woman)

See also 
Lists of British films
2021 in film
2021 in British music
2021 in British radio
2021 in British television
2021 in the United Kingdom
List of British films of 2020
List of British films of 2022

References

External links
 

2021
Lists of 2021 films by country or language